GLC may refer to:

Music 
 GLC (rapper) (born 1975), American rapper signed to Kanye West's G.O.O.D. Music record label
 Goldie Lookin Chain, Welsh rappers

Technology 
 Gas-liquid chromatography
 Geographic Locator Codes
 Global Linear Collider, now merged into the International Linear Collider proposal
 Great Lakes Central Railroad
 Mazda GLC, a compact car
 Mercedes-Benz GLC, an SUV

Television 
 "GLC: The Carnage Continues...", an episode of the television series The Comic Strip Presents...
 God's Learning Channel, an American television station

Other uses 
 Glasgow Central station, in Scotland
 Glucose
 Government-linked company or corporation
 Government Law Center, a research institute at Albany Law School, Albany, New York, United States
 Government Law College (disambiguation)
 Greater London Council
 Great Lakes Commission
 Green Lake Crew, a rowing club based in Seattle, Washington, United States
 Gutnius Lutheran Church, in Papua New Guinea